Anagnorisma is a genus of moths of the family Noctuidae.

Species
 Anagnorisma chamrani Gyulai, Rabieh, Seraj, Ronkay & Esfandiari, 2013
 Anagnorisma eucratides (Boursin, 1957)
 Anagnorisma goniophora (Hacker, Ronkay & Varga, 1990)
 Anagnorisma glareomima (Varga & Ronkay, 1991)
 Anagnorisma zakaria Ronkay & Varga, 1999

References

Noctuinae